Facundo Altamirano (born 21 March 1996) is an Argentine professional footballer who plays as a goalkeeper for Argentine Primera División side Banfield.

Career
Altamirano started with Argentine Primera División side Banfield. He first appeared on a Banfield first-team teamsheet in May 2015, being an unused substitute for games against Independiente and Aldosivi. On 10 September 2017, Altamirano made his professional debut in a 3–1 league defeat to River Plate.

Career statistics
.

References

External links

1996 births
Living people
Sportspeople from Buenos Aires Province
Argentine footballers
Association football goalkeepers
Argentine Primera División players
Primera Nacional players
Club Atlético Banfield footballers
Estudiantes de Buenos Aires footballers
Club Atlético Patronato footballers